René Wagner (born 7 May 1938) is a Luxembourgian former swimmer. He competed in the men's 100 metre freestyle at the 1960 Summer Olympics.

References

1938 births
Living people
Luxembourgian male freestyle swimmers
Olympic swimmers of Luxembourg
Swimmers at the 1960 Summer Olympics
People from Mamer